Saifuddin "Saif" Ahmad is a Bangladeshi-American restaurateur and World Series of Poker champion.  Ahmad is the owner of several Tony Roma's restaurants in Los Angeles, California, and won the 2007 World Series of Poker bracelet in the $2,000 Limit Hold'em.

Ahmad came to the United States from Bangladesh to attend college where he earned a master's degree in chemical engineering from the California Institute of Technology.

As of 2008, Ahmad has live tournament winnings of over $560,000.

World Series of Poker bracelets

References

American poker players
Bangladeshi emigrants to the United States
World Series of Poker bracelet winners
Living people
Year of birth missing (living people)